Revature is a technology talent development company headquartered in Reston, Virginia, USA. Its business model involves hiring recent U.S. college graduates, training them in high demand software skills, and deploying them to work on information technology projects for Revature’s corporate and government clients.

Unlike coding “boot camps” and most other forms of information technology training, Revature does not charge its students tuition, instead paying them a salary during their training and project work.

History 
Revature was founded in 2003 (under the name Multivision) as a traditional staffing agency, but experienced difficulty finding prospective employees with the technology skills employers sought. Around 2014, it became a talent development company with the aim of supplying those unmet needs.

In its current form, the company’s clients have included Accenture plc, Capital One, the Financial Industry Regulatory Authority (FINRA), and REI Systems, Inc. According to the company, it has trained more than 7,000 software engineers and is, according to Bloomberg, the largest employer of emerging technology talent in the U.S.

In April 2020, during the COVID-19 pandemic, Revature announced that it would “donate approximately 2,000 hours of instructor-led, virtual coding training to essential workers, their families and others who have been impacted by COVID-19.”

Other initiatives 
In September 2020, Revature announced the launch of a suite of new workforce reskilling services designed for companies seeking to retrain their existing employees.

Since 2020, the company has partnered with the Thurgood Marshall College Fund to offer scholarships to undergraduates at historically black colleges and universities that are members of the Fund.

References 


External links 

 Official website

Technology companies
Companies based in Virginia